The 2000 Clásica de San Sebastián was the 20th edition of the Clásica de San Sebastián cycle race and was held on 12 August 2000. The race started and finished in San Sebastián. The race was won by Erik Dekker of the Rabobank team.

General classification

References

Clásica de San Sebastián
San
Clasica De San Sebastian
August 2000 sports events in Europe